Wayne Township is one of eleven townships in Randolph County, Indiana. As of the 2010 census, its population was 4,611 and it contained 2,195 housing units.

History
Wayne Township was established in 1838.

Geography

Cities and towns
 Union City

Unincorporated towns
 Bartonia at 
 Harrisville at 
 Haysville Corner at 
 South Salem at 
(This list is based on USGS data and may include former settlements.)

References

External links
 Indiana Township Association
 United Township Association of Indiana

Townships in Randolph County, Indiana
Townships in Indiana